Alexander Yeronov (born May 5, 1989) is a Belarusian ice hockey player.

Yeronov competed in the 2013 IIHF World Championship as a member of the Belarus men's national ice hockey team.

References

1989 births
Living people
Belarusian ice hockey defencemen